The Women's junior road race of the 2013 UCI Road World Championships was a cycling event that took place on 27 September 2013 in the region of Tuscany, Italy.

The race route was 82.85 km long and the start and finish were by the Nelson Mandela Forum in Florence.

Qualification
All National Federations could enter 8 riders of whom 4 could start. Besides of that, the below listed continental champions could be entered in addition to this number.

Participating nations
31 nations participated in the women's junior road race.

  Argentina
  Australia
  Austria
  Belgium
  Belarus
  Canada
  Colombia
  Czech Republic
  Denmark
  Spain
  Estonia
  France
  Great Britain
  Germany
  Hong Kong
  Italy
  Jordan
  Japan
  Lithuania
  Mexico
  Netherlands
  New Zealand
  Poland
  South Africa
  Russia
  Serbia
  Slovakia
  Sweden
  Thailand
  Ukraine
  United States

Schedule

Source

Final classification

References

Women's junior road race
UCI Road World Championships – Women's junior road race
2013 in women's road cycling